Estarabad may refer to:
 Estarabad or Astarabad, former name of Gorgan
 Estarabad Rural District
 Estarabad-e Jonubi Rural District (South Estarabad Rural District)
 Estarabad-e Shomali Rural District (North Estarabad Rural District)
 Astrabad shad, Alosa caspia persica

See also
 Astarabad